Out of Line Music is an independent record label located in Berlin, Germany. Out of Line is distributed by Rough Trade (Believe Digital) and exclusive partner to publishing giant BMG Rights Management, through sister company Edition Layer Cake.

History 
Founded in 1995 as a mail order, Out of Line quickly grew into becoming an influential label in the industry, with records from artists such as Combichrist, Blutengel, Lord of the Lost and others reaching peak positions on charts.

The label focus shifted over the past few years to signing acts from the modern rock and metal scene, announcing a handful of new signings in 2021 such as Being as an Ocean, EGGVN, Novelists FR, Betraying the Martyrs, TEN56, Villain of the Story, Ashen and True North.

Notable artists 

 Amduscia
 Ashbury Heights
 Ashen
 Balance Breach
 Being As An Ocean
 Betraying The Martyrs
 Bloodred Hourglass
 BlutEngel
 Cane Hill
 Client
 Combichrist
 Elwood Stray
 Emarosa
 Erdling
 Gyze
 Hocico
 Mors Subita
 Novelists
 Rabia Sorda
 Rave the Reqviem
 Signal Aout 42
 Suicide Commando
 The Klinik
 ten56
 True North

References

External links 

Electronic music record labels
German companies established in 1995
German record labels
Industrial record labels